A campus is traditionally the land on which a college or university and related institutional buildings are situated. Usually a college campus includes libraries, lecture halls, residence halls, student centers or dining halls, and park-like settings.

A modern campus is a collection of buildings and grounds that belong to a given institution, either academic or non-academic. Examples include the Googleplex and the Apple Campus.

Etymology
The word derives from a Latin word for "field" and was first used to describe the large field adjacent Nassau Hall of the College of New Jersey (now Princeton University) in 1774. The field separated Princeton from the small nearby town.

Some other American colleges later adopted the word to describe individual fields at their own institutions, but "campus" did not yet describe the whole university property. A school might have one space called a campus, another called a field, and still another called a yard.

History
The tradition of a campus began with the medieval European universities where the students and teachers lived and worked together in a cloistered environment. The notion of the importance of the setting to academic life later migrated to America, and early colonial educational institutions were based on the Scottish and English collegiate system.

The campus evolved from the cloistered model in Europe to a diverse set of independent styles in the United States. Early colonial colleges were all built in proprietary styles, with some contained in single buildings, such as the campus of Princeton University or arranged in a version of the cloister reflecting American values, such as Harvard's. Both the campus designs and the architecture of colleges throughout the country have evolved in response to trends in the broader world, with most representing several different contemporary and historical styles and arrangements.

Uses

The meaning expanded to include the whole institutional property during the 20th century, with the old meaning persisting into the 1950s in some places.

Office buildings

Sometimes the lands on which company office buildings sit, along with the buildings, are called campuses. The Microsoft Campus in Redmond, Washington, is a good example of this usage. Hospitals and even airports sometimes use the term to describe the territory of their respective facilities.

Universities

The word campus has also been applied to European universities, although some such institutions (in particular, "ancient" universities such as Bologna, Padua, Oxford and Cambridge) are characterized by ownership of individual buildings in university town-like urban settings rather than sprawling park-like lawns in which buildings are placed.

See also
 Campus novel
 Campus university
 Satellite campus
 History of college campuses and architecture in the United States

References

External links

 
Universities and colleges